The 175th Street station (also known as 175th Street–George Washington Bridge Bus Terminal) is a station on the IND Eighth Avenue Line of the New York City Subway. Located in the Washington Heights neighborhood in Upper Manhattan, at the intersection of 175th Street and Fort Washington Avenue, it is served by the A train at all times.

History
The station opened on September 10, 1932, as part of the city-operated Independent Subway System (IND)'s initial segment, the Eighth Avenue Line between Chambers Street and 207th Street.

The elevators at the station were installed in November 1989, making the station one of the earliest to comply with the Americans with Disabilities Act of 1990.

The station was planned to be rehabilitated as part of the 2015–2019 MTA Capital Program.

Station layout 

The underground station has two tracks and one island platform, with single green columns in the center of the platform rather than the double columns found near the platform edges at other stations. The tilework in this station is plain, and lacks the maroon-colored tile bands that are present at adjacent stations along the line.

It is linked by a tunnel to the George Washington Bridge Bus Station. The tunnel, which is maintained by the Port Authority of New York and New Jersey, is not wheelchair-accessible, as using it requires traversing a short flight of stairs between the tunnel and the station mezzanine. This tunnel is closed at night between 1 a.m. and 5 a.m.

The 174th Street Yard, used to store trains assigned to the C service, is adjacent to this station to the east.

Exits

The full-time exits are at 175th Street and 177th Street. The station is fully accessible, with an elevator at the northeast corner of 177th Street, and another from the mezzanine to the platform. The 177th Street exit offers a direct passageway into the basement of the George Washington Bridge Bus Station, but it includes stairs.

The ADA-accessible exits at the northwest, northeast, and southwest corners of Fort Washington Avenue and 177th Street. The northwest corner has two stairs, the southwest corner has one stair, and the northeast corner has one stair and one elevator. There are also exits at the southwest and southeast corners of Fort Washington Avenue and 175th Street.

There is also a closed exit at the south end of the station that leads to the southeast corner of 174th Street and Fort Washington Avenue via a passageway. The passageway was not monitored and was closed to improve security. In June 1994, the MTA Board approved a plan to permanently close the entrance, allowing the passageway to be sealed with brick-and-mortar with the street staircase slabbed over. At this point, the entrance had been closed for several years. A public meeting was held in May 1994, along with proposed station access changes at other stations.

Bus service

The station and the nearby George Washington Bridge Bus Station are served by ten local MTA Regional Bus Operations routes and various interstate bus routes.

References

External links 

 
 Station Reporter — A Lefferts
 Station Reporter — A Rockaway
 The Subway Nut — 175th Street–George Washington Bus Terminal 
 175th Street entrance from Google Maps Street View
 Fort Washington Avenue entrance from Google Maps Street View
 177th Street entrance from Google Maps Street View
 Platform from Google Maps Street View

Washington Heights, Manhattan
IND Eighth Avenue Line stations
New York City Subway stations in Manhattan
Railway stations in the United States opened in 1932
1932 establishments in New York City